Spring Garden School No. 1 is a historic school building located in the Poplar neighborhood of Philadelphia, Pennsylvania.  It was designed by Irwin T. Catharine and built in 1927–1928.  It is a three-story, three bay brick building in the Moderne-style. It features a limestone entrance surround, a limestone parapet, and decorative tile.

It was added to the National Register of Historic Places in 1986. By 2013 the building had been abandoned.  the building had old textbooks and graffiti inside. Around that period there was a plan to convert the buildings into apartments for disadvantaged elderly people.

Around 2017, the school building reopened as affordable housing for veterans.

References

School buildings on the National Register of Historic Places in Philadelphia
Moderne architecture in Pennsylvania
School buildings completed in 1928
Poplar, Philadelphia
Defunct schools in Pennsylvania
1928 establishments in Pennsylvania